Notre Dame High School is a private, Roman Catholic high school in East Stroudsburg, Pennsylvania, United States.  It is located in the Roman Catholic Diocese of Scranton.

Background
Notre Dame was established in 1967.  It primarily serves residents in Monroe County, Pennsylvania and surrounding counties in Pennsylvania, New York, and New Jersey.

Notes and references

External links
 Official website

Catholic secondary schools in Pennsylvania
Educational institutions established in 1967
Schools in Monroe County, Pennsylvania
Private middle schools in Pennsylvania
1967 establishments in Pennsylvania